Kottarakkara Punalur Diocese is one of the 30 dioceses of the Malankara Orthodox Syrian Church. The diocese was created after dividing the then existed Thiruvananthapuram Diocese and Kollam Diocese on 15 August 2010. The diocese was inaugurated on 23 January 2011. Yuhanon Mar Thevodoros was installed the first Metropolitan of the diocese. Kottarakkara Kottappuram Seminary is the Bishop house of the Diocese. Fr. Philip Mathew served as the diocesan secretary. The diocesan secretary is Fr. C D Rajan.

Diocesan Metropolitans

Diocesan Secretaries

Parishes
 St. George Orthodox Church, Ampalathumkala, Kottarakkara
 St. Gregorios Orthodox Church, Alakkuzhy
 St. George Orthodox Church, Ambalakara
 Mar Yakob Burdana Orthodox Church, Ambalathumkala
 St. George Orthodox Church, Ambanadu
 St. Mary's Orthodox Church, Aringada
 St. Mary's Orthodox Church, Avaneeswaram
 Mar Aprem Orthodox Church, Chakkuvarakkal
 Chaliakkara St. Mary's Orthodox Church, Chaliakkara St. Mary's
 St. George Orthodox Church, Jayabharatham, Chemmanthoor
 St. John's Orthodox Church, Chemmanthoor
 Mar Gregorios Orthodox Church, Chembanaruvi
 St. Mary's Orthodox Church, Edamon
 St. George Orthodox Church, Elambal
 St. George Salem Orthodox Church, Iypalloor
 Mar Baselios Mar Gregorios Orthodox Valiyapalli, Kalayapuram
 St. Mary's Orthodox Church, Kalayapuram
 St. George Orthodox Church, Karavaloor
 St. George Orthodox Church, Karavoor
 St. George Orthodox Church, Karavoor
 St. Ignathios Orthodox Church, Kottappuram
 St. George Orthodox Church, Kuttiyilbhagom
 Mar Gregorios Orthodox Church, Manlil
 Mar Gregorios Orthodox Church Marangadu
 St. George Orthodox Church, Melila
 St. Stephen's Orthodox Church, Mylom
 St. Mary's Orthodox Church, Narikkal
 St. George Orthodox Church, Nedumpara
 St. Mary's Orthodox Church, Neeleswaram
 Mar Gregarious Orthodox Church, Nellikunnam
 St. George Orthodox Church, Nellikunnam
 St. George Orthodox Church, Njarakkadu,Kunnicodu
 St. George Orthodox Church, Odanavattom
 St. John's Orthodox Church, Ottakkal
 St. George Orthodox Church, Kottarakkara, Padinjaretheruvu
 Mar Baselios Mar Gregorios Orthodox Church, Palanirappu
 St. George Orthodox Church, Pattamala
 St. George Orthodox Church, Perumkuzhy
 St. George Orthodox Church, Kalayapuram, Poovathoor East
 St. George Orthodox Church, Punalur Papermill
 St. George Orthodox Church, Puthoothadam
 St. Gregorious Orthodox Church, Sadanandapuram
 St. George Orthodox Church, Thenmala
 St. George Orthodox Church, Thollikode
 St. George Orthodox Church, Thrikkannamangal
 St. George Orthodox Church, Bethel, Uliyanad
 St. George & St. Mary's Orthodox Church, Uliyanad
 Mar Semavoon Desthuni Orthodox Church, Ummannur
 St. George Orthodox Church, Urukunnu
 St. John's Orthodox Church, Vadakode
 St. George Orthodox Church, Valakode
 St. Gregorios Orthodox Church, Valakom
 Mar Bersowma Orthodox Church, Vengoor
 St. Stephen's Orthodox Church, Vengoor
 St. Thomas Orthodox Church, Vilayanthoor
 St. Mary's Orthodox Church, Villoor
 St. George Orthodox Church, Kulamudy
 St. Gregorios Orthodox Church, Chithrapuri, Kariara, Punalur

See also
 Baselios Mar Thoma Paulose II

Notes

External links
Website of Malankara Orthodox Church

Malankara Orthodox Syrian Church dioceses
2011 establishments in Kerala